The Lyman Terrace is a historic three-story apartment building in Lincoln, Nebraska. It was built in 1889 for Charles W. Lyman, and designed in the eclectic style by architect Ferdinand C. Fiske. By 1890, it belonged to William Barr, a German immigrant and real estate investor who first settled in Lincoln in 1861, when it was still known as Lancaster, and also owned Barr Terrace. The building has been listed on the National Register of Historic Places since October 1, 1979.

References

Apartment buildings in Nebraska
National Register of Historic Places in Lincoln, Nebraska
Residential buildings completed in 1889
1889 establishments in Nebraska